The women's  67 kg competition of the taekwondo events at the 2015 Pan American Games took place on July 21 at the Mississauga Sports Centre. The defending Pan American Games champion was Melissa Pagnotta of the Canada.

Qualification

Most athletes qualified through the qualification tournament held in March 2015 in Mexico, while host nation Canada was permitted to enter one athlete. An athlete from Haiti later received a wildcard to compete in the event.

Schedule
All times are Eastern Daylight Time (UTC-4).

Results

Main bracket
The final results were:

Repechage

References

Taekwondo at the 2015 Pan American Games
Pan